Ayodele or Ayodelé is a Yoruba name meaning "joy comes home"
People with the name include:
Francis Morgan Ayodele Thompson (born 1958), British decathlete
Ayodele Adeleye (born 1988), Nigerian football defender
Ayodele Aladefa (born 1970), Nigerian former long jumper
Sylvester Ayodele Arise, Nigerian senator who represents the People's Democratic Party (PDP) in Ekiti State
Ayodele Awojobi (1937–1984), Nigerian academic, author, inventor, social crusader and activist
Akin Ayodele (born 1979), former American football linebacker
Franklin Ayodele (born 1987), Nigerian football striker
Remi Ayodele (born 1983), former American football defensive tackle
Ayodele Bakare (born 1960), Nigerian professional basketball coach
Saidu Ayodele Balogun, the first Governor of Ogun State, Nigeria after it was formed in March 1976
Ayodele Fayose (born 1960), the current governor of Ekiti State in Nigeria
M. Ayodele Heath, American poet, spoken-word performer, and fiction writer
Ayodelé Ikuesan (born 1985), French sprinter who specialises in the 60 metres and 4x100 metres relay
Stephen Ayodele Makinwa (born 1983), Nigerian football striker

See also
Dele

References

Yoruba given names
Yoruba-language surnames